The 1903 Kansas Jayhawks football team was an American football team that represented the University of Kansas as an independent during the 1903 college football season. In January 1903, Kansas hired Boss Weeks, who was the quarterback of Fielding H. Yost's 1901 and 1902 "Point-a-Minute" teams at Michigan, as its new head coach.  In their only season under Weeks, the Jayhawks compiled a 6–3 record and outscored opponents by a combined total of 118 to 39. The Jayhawks played their home games at McCook Field in Lawrence, Kansas. Alpha Brumage was the team captain.

Schedule

References

Kansas
Kansas Jayhawks football seasons
Kansas Jayhawks football